Tomás Facundo Mariano Ortiz (born 10 March 2000) is an Argentine professional footballer who plays as an attacking midfielder for Chilean club Cobreloa.

Career
Ortiz came through the youth ranks at Defensa y Justicia. His first appearance in a first-team squad arrived in December 2018 against Huracán under manager Sebastián Beccacece, though the attacking midfielder wouldn't be substituted on in the away Primera División draw. He soon returned to their academy, with Hernán Crespo reintegrating him into the senior set-up in late-2020. After going unused on the bench versus Colón on 21 November in the Copa de la Liga Profesional, Ortiz made his debut on 29 November in a 3–2 home defeat to Central Córdoba; starting the match, before being subbed for Jonathan Farías.

On 7 January 2022, Ortiz joined Chilean Primera B de Chile club C.D. Cobreloa.

Career statistics
.

Notes

References

External links

2000 births
Living people
People from Florencio Varela Partido
Argentine footballers
Argentine expatriate footballers
Association football midfielders
Defensa y Justicia footballers
Cobreloa footballers
Argentine Primera División players
Primera B de Chile players
Argentine expatriate sportspeople in Chile
Expatriate footballers in Chile
Sportspeople from Buenos Aires Province